Rothwell is a small village and civil parish in the district of West Lindsey in north-east Lincolnshire, England. The population of the civil parish at the 2011 census was 226.

Rothwell's medieval church is dedicated to St Mary Magdalene. The Blacksmith's Arms, formerly the Nickerson Arms, was the village public house – it was situated on Hill Rise. Nickerson Seeds, owned by the EU's largest seed company Groupe Limagrain, is based in the village.

Notable People 
Joseph Nickerson founder of Nickerson Seeds, after whom the village pub is named

References

External links

 West Lindsey District Council
 Stained glass window in the church

Villages in Lincolnshire
Civil parishes in Lincolnshire
West Lindsey District